The Capricornia Correctional Centre is located in Central Queensland, Australia, and services mainly the Rockhampton and Central Queensland areas. It is a high and low security facility and can hold up to 500 inmates.

The facility will commence an expansion at the end of 2017 adding approximately another 164 beds. 

Construction of the centre began in August 1999, and it was officially opened on 12 September 2001. The centre replaced the Rockhampton Correctional Centre (also known as Etna Creek Prison), which had been built in 1969. A portion of the RCC was incorporated into the new prison, which was built on a site adjacent.

Notes

References
Keenan, Amanda, et al. (2002). "Crime, Prisons a Growth Industry." The Australian. 30 September.
Odgers, Rosemary (2002). "Cash puts more on the beat." Courier Mail. 19 July.
O'Malley, Brendan (2002). "Mcgrady Remains Quiet About Future of Private Prison." Courier Mail. 11 May.

2001 establishments in Australia
Prisons in Queensland
Buildings and structures in Rockhampton